The Ministry for Jewish Affairs was an interwar Lithuanian government portfolio.

This ministry was established as a result of bargaining between the Jewish community leaders and the Lithuanian government to gain the support of the latter in the peace conference negotiations over the boundaries of the new Lithuanian State. For the same reason, there was a Ministry for Belarusian Affairs. The portfolio was abolished on March 19, 1924.

List of incumbents
 Jakub Wygodzki from November 11, 1918, to April 12, 1919
 Max Soloveitchik from April 12, 1919, to April 1922 (resignation)
 Julius Brutzkus from April 1922 to February 22, 1923
 Bernard Naftal Friedman from February 22, 1923, to June 29, 1923
 Simon Yakovlevich Rosenbaum from June 29, 1923, till his resignation on February 12, 1924

See also
 Ethnic minorities in Lithuania
 Lithuanian Ministry for Belarusian Affairs

References

 
Political history of Lithuania
History of Lithuania (1918–1940)
1918 establishments in Lithuania
Ministries established in 1918
Ministries disestablished in 1924